President Gari Abbai is a 1987 Indian Telugu-language drama film, produced by A. V. Subba Rao under the Prasad Art Pictures banner and directed by T. Rama Rao. It stars Nandamuri Balakrishna and Suhasini. The music was composed by Chakravarthy.

Plot
The film begins in a village where its President Chandraiah is a paragon of nobility, the first-ever in accord from the past 25 years, and defines serenity. He leads buoyant domesticity, his ideal wife Anasuya, 3 sons Sivaram, Prasad, & Ramakrishna 2 daughters-in-law Kamala, & Satya, 1 daughter Poorna, and a grandson Gopi. Gopi is sweetest to both Chandraiah & Ramakrishna and he too strongly bonded with him. Suraiah is pernicious and has made a conjugal bond with Chandraiah’s family by nuptial of his elder daughter Satya with Prasad. He goes spare against Chandraiah and at all times keeps pace with him. Ramakrishna is a vibrant one that picks up the ant type of gauntlet which is overthrown by him. Chandraiah is vexed with his hijinks. Nevertheless, he owns to face villainy.

Meanwhile, Suraiah carries several barbarities in the village, and to escape he purports devils on the outskirts. Latha the younger daughter of Suraiah appears accomplishing her education. After a series of donnybrook, Ramakrishna & Latha crush. Interim, Delhi Babai a feline, whisks with Suraiah and dethrones Chandraiah on treachery. However, Chandraiah scrubs his vindicate by re-contesting and triumphs victory when Suraiah flares up with vengeance. At the same time, Chandraiah fixes a fine alliance for Poorna. Just before, the wedding, Papa Rao son of Suraiah, tries to molest Poorna when Ramakrishna rescues her with the help of Latha and stabs Papa Rao in that brawl. Exploiting it, Suraiah inculpates him in murder offense and sullies on Poorna’s chastity. In the court, Ramakrishna maintains silence to protect his sister’s honor but Latha divulges the reality and acquits him.

Unfortunately, Poorna’s husband Venu and in-laws misinterpret and chuck her. Moreover, futile brothers & virago sisters-in-law hinder her stay. Hence, a rift arises and the family splits into two. Chandraiah has to quit the house but is unable to take the separation of Gopi. Moreover, Suraiah is below the belt for the constrainedly connubial of Latha with his ally Govindaiah’s brother Raja. Ramakrishna hiatus the ruse and couples Latha. Parallelly, Ramakrishna solicits Venu to accept Poorna then he seeks 2 lakhs as dowry. Knowing it, Suraiah plots with Delhi Babai to eliminate Ramakrishna, so, announces a challenge with 2 lakhs of reward. It implies proving superstitions in their village as false for which he has to spend a night on the outskirts. Ramakrishna takes up the challenge audaciously and conquests it. Tragically, Gopi is killed by the blackguards in that chaos. Being cognizant of it, forbearing Chandraiah outbursts and behests Ramakrishna destroy the demons. At last, he ceases the baddies when Venu also realizes his mistake and takes Poorna back. Finally, the movie ends on a happy note with the reunion of the family.

Cast

Soundtrack

The music was composed by Chakravarthy. Lyrics were written by Veturi. The music was released by the LEO Audio Company.

Other
 VCDs and DVDs were released by Moser Baer Home Videos, Hyderabad.

References

1987 films
1980s Telugu-language films
Films directed by T. Rama Rao
Films scored by K. Chakravarthy